Siglo XXI Editores ("21st Century") is an Ibero-American book publisher. It was acquired in 2021 by Capital Intelectual.

Founded in Mexico on November 18, 1965, by Arnaldo Orfila Reynal, former director of the Fondo de Cultura Económica, who directed it until 1989, when Martí Soler, recognized as one of the best editors, directed it for two years.

References

Further reading 

 

Publishing companies of Mexico